Opvs Contra Natvram is the twelfth studio album by Polish extreme metal band Behemoth, released on 16 September 2022 through Nuclear Blast.

Critical reception 

Upon release, Opvs Contra Natvram was met with universal acclaim from music critics like its predecessors, The Satanist and I Loved You at Your Darkest. A 9/10 was given to the album from Wall of Sound, saying "What we can say without a shred of doubt is that Opvs Contra Natvram stands firmly amongst the year's best music releases."

Track listing 
All music composed by Nergal. All arrangements by Behemoth. All lyrics written by Nergal, except where noted.

Personnel 
Behemoth
Adam "Nergal" Darski – lead guitar, vocals, lyrics
Tomasz "Orion" Wróblewski – bass
Zbigniew Robert "Inferno" Promiński – drums
Patryk Dominik "Seth" Sztyber – rhythm guitar

Additional personnel
Daniel Bergstrand – production, editing
Sebastian Has – engineering, management
Filip Hałucha and Haldor Grunberg – engineering
Joe Barresi – mixing
Bob Ludwig – mastering
Jun Murakawa – musical assistance

References

2022 albums
Behemoth (band) albums
Metal Blade Records albums
Nuclear Blast albums
Mystic Production albums